Križe is a village in the Municipality of Tržič in the Upper Carniola region of Slovenia.

Church

The parish church in the village is dedicated to the Feast of the Holy Cross.

References

External links

Križe at Geopedia

Populated places in the Municipality of Tržič